The southern ornate nursery frog (Cophixalus australis) is a species of small rainforest frog that is endemic to Australia.

Description
The species grows up to about 30 mm in length (SVL). Colouration varies through cream, grey and brown, with paler underparts. There are dark stripes through the eyes, a dark W-shaped marking on the upper back and yellow spots on the lower back.

Behaviour
The species breeds on land, in spring or summer after rain, with eggs laid in small clusters in nests among rocks, in soil burrows or beneath leaf litter. The nest is guarded by the male. The tadpoles develop entirely within the eggs and hatch as small frogs.

Distribution and habitat
The species’ distribution is restricted to the Wet Tropics of Queensland in north-eastern Australia, where it has been recorded from the area encompassing the southern Atherton Tableland, Mount Bellenden Ker, Mount Bartle Frere, Tully and Innisfail.

References

 
Cophixalus
Amphibians of Queensland
Amphibians described in 2012
Frogs of Australia